June 6th 2013 is a live album by American jazz trumpeter Wadada Leo Smith recorded with one of the foremost Italian avant-jazz group Eco D'Alberi.

Background
The album was recorded on June 6, 2013 in Conservatorio Guido Cantelli during the Novara Jazz Festival and released as the first in the Novara Jazz Series. All track titles are quotes from poems of Henry Dumas. The release was limited to 500 hand-numbered copies.

Reception
A reviewer of Forced Exposure noted "The music, recorded live during the 2013 edition of the festival, resounds with great "live" intensity throughout the entire set. Wadada's spectacular trumpet sound is highly integrated within the group sound texture. Very dense sound-events alternate with more open parts within a narrative musical structure, essentially based on deep hearing and tight collective interplay."

Track listing

Personnel
Band
Wadada Leo Smith – trumpet
Antonio Borghini – bass
Edoardo Marraffa – sax (sopranino), sax (tenor)
Fabrizio Spera – drums, mastering, mixing, translation
Alberto Braida – mastering, mixing, piano

Production
Carlo Amico – graphic design
Gianmaria Aprile – engineer, mastering, mixing
Marcello Lorrai – liner notes

References

Wadada Leo Smith live albums
2015 live albums